Achnopogon is a genus of flowering plants in the family Asteraceae, described as a genus in 1957.

The entire genus is endemic to Venezuela.

 Species
 Achnopogon steyermarkii Aristeg. - State of Bolívar in southeastern Venezuela
 Achnopogon virgatus Maguire, Steyerm. & Wurdack - State of Bolívar in southeastern Venezuela

References

Asteraceae genera
Endemic flora of Venezuela
Stifftioideae